Pseudothurmannia is a genus of extinct cephalopods belonging to the subclass Ammonoidea and included in the family Crioceratitidae of the ammonitid superfamily Ancylocerataceae. These fast-moving nektonic carnivores  lived in the Cretaceous period, from Hauterivian age to Barremian age.

Species

 Pseudothurmannia angulicostata d'Orbigny, 1863
 Pseudothurmannia belimelensis Dimtrova, 1967
 ?Pseudothurmannia biassalensis Dimtrova, 1967
 Pseudothurmannia catulloi Parona, 1898
 ?Pseudothurmannia crimensis Wiedmann, 1962
 Pseudothurmannia grandis Busnardo, 1970
 Pseudothurmannia isocostata Kakabadze, 1981
 Pseudothurmannia karakaschi Manolov, 1962
 Pseudothurmannia lurensis Busnardo, 1970
 Pseudothurmannia macilenta d'Orbigny, 1841
 Pseudothurmannia mortilleti Pictet and de Loriol, 1858
 Pseudothurmannia ohmi Winkler, 1868
 Pseudothurmannia picteti Sarkar, 1955
 Pseudothurmannia provencalis Wiedmann, 1962
 Pseudothurmannia pseudomalbosi Sarasin and Schandelmayer, 1901
 Pseudothurmannia renevieri Sarasin and Schöndelmayer, 1901
 Pseudothurmannia rugosa Busnardo, 2003
 Pseudothurmannia sarasini Sarkar, 1955

Description
They show flat or slightly convex sides, a surface with dense ribs and a subquadrate whorl section.

Distribution
Fossils of species within this genus have been found in the Cretaceous rocks of Antarctica, Bulgaria, Czechoslovakia, France, Hungary, Italy, Japan, Morocco, Spain, Russia and United States.

References

External links 
 Hoedemaeker, Philip. J.   SEXUAL DIMORPHISM IN THE GENUS PSEUDOTHURMANNIA
 Crioceratites

 Jsdammonites
 Ammonites

Ammonitida genera
Crioceratitidae
Cretaceous ammonites
Ammonites of Europe